Things to Come from Those Now Gone is the third album by Muhal Richard Abrams which was released on the Delmark label in 1975 and features performances of seven of Abrams' compositions by Abrams with varying line-ups that include Wallace McMillan, Edwin Daugherty, Richard Brown, Emanuel Cranshaw, Reggie Willis, Rufus Reid, Steve McCall and Wilbur Campbell with vocals by Ella Jackson.

Reception
The Allmusic review by Brian Olewnick calls the album "a hodgepodge of an album with varying combinations of musicians producing work that ranges from the weirdly bad to the astonishingly beautiful". The Penguin Guide to Jazz awarded the album 3½ stars, stating "Things to Come is a ringing assertion of Abram's lifelong belief that musical advancement can only be achieved by observing the lessons of tradition". The Rolling Stone Jazz Record Guide said "Things to Come from Those Now Gone captures Abrams and the AACM in the middle of this decade running the gamut between chamber ballads, hard bop, electronics, mock opera and high energy".

Track listing
All compositions by Muhal Richard Abrams
 "Ballad for New Souls" - 4:39  
 "Things to Come from Those Now Gone" - 4:09  
 "How Are You?" - 4:41  
 "In Retrospect" - 3:49  
 "Ballad for Old Souls" - 5:58  
 "1 and 4 Plus 2 and 7" - 10:06  
 "March of the Transients" - 6:12

Personnel
Muhal Richard Abrams: piano
Wallace McMillan: alto saxophone, flute (tracks 1, 2 & 7)
Edwin Daugherty: alto saxophone, tenor saxophone (tracks 2 & 7) 
Richard Brown: tenor saxophone (track 4)
Emanuel Cranshaw: vibraphone (tracks 3 & 5)
Reggie Willis: bass (tracks 2 & 7)
Rufus Reid: bass (tracks 3, 4 & 5)
Steve McCall:  drums (tracks 2 & 6)
Wilbur Campbell: drums (tracks 2 & 7) 
Ella Jackson: vocals (track 3)

References

1975 albums
Muhal Richard Abrams albums
Delmark Records albums
Albums produced by Bob Koester